Robyn Elizabeth Decker (born January 17, 1987) is an American soccer defender who plays for Norwegian team Avaldsnes.

Decker attended Mercy High School in Middletown, Connecticut. She attended Fairfield University where she played 84 times for the Fairfield Stags between 2005 and 2008.

References

External links 
 

1987 births
Living people
American women's soccer players
QBIK players
Jitex BK players
Damallsvenskan players
American expatriate sportspeople in Sweden
Expatriate women's footballers in Sweden
Women's association football defenders
Fairfield Stags women's soccer players
Kvarnsvedens IK players